Westlands is a suburban area and ward in Newcastle-under-Lyme, Staffordshire.

Religion

The Church in the Westlands is a local ecumenical partnership between St Peter's Church (Methodist) and St Andrew's Church (Anglican).

At St. Andrew's Church the Reverend Andrew Dawswell is the Vicar and the Reverend Shaun Morris is the Curate.

At St. Peter's Church the Minister is the Reverend Robert Fishar.

Newcastle-under-Lyme